Paul Warren Carter (May 1, 1894 - September 11, 1984) was a major league pitcher from 1914 to 1920. Carter was nicknamed "Nick".

Sources

1894 births
1984 deaths
Cleveland Naps players
Cleveland Indians players
Chicago Cubs players
Major League Baseball pitchers
Baseball players from Georgia (U.S. state)
Rhodes Lynx baseball players
Kansas City Blues (baseball) players
Jersey City Skeeters players
Maysville Angels players
Portsmouth Cobblers players